This is a list of Nigeria women's international footballers who have played for the Nigeria women's national football team since the first match in 1991.

Players

See also 
 Nigeria women's national football team

References 

 
International footballers
International footballers
Nigeria
Football in Nigeria
Association football player non-biographical articles